Legislative elections were held in the Comoros on 19 January 2020; in constituencies where no candidate received a majority, a second round was held alongside local elections on 23 February. The elections were boycotted by the main opposition parties, including the two largest parties in the outgoing Assembly, the Union for the Development of the Comoros and Juwa Party, in protest at constitutional reform and political repression, The result was a landslide victory for President Azali Assoumani's Convention for the Renewal of the Comoros, which won 20 of the 24 elected seats.

Background
Following decades when the politics of the Comoros was shaped by dictatorship, frequent coups, and civil war, the adoption of the December 2001 Constitution inaugurated the only sustained democratic order in the country since its independence from France in 1975. Azali Assoumani, the leader of the last successful military coup in 1999, remained as president after winning multi-party elections in March 2002. Constitutionally barred from serving consecutive terms, Assoumani stepped down from the presidency for a decade in 2006, before being reelected in 2016.

Beginning in late 2017, President Assoumani promoted a vision to make the Comoros into a developing nation by 2030. On 12 April 2018 he "temporarily" suspended the elected Constitutional Court and transferred its duties to a new Constitutional Chamber within the Supreme Court whose members he had appointed. Two weeks later, Assoumani announced that a series of consultations held with representatives of the nation during the preceding months had determined that to realize his vision of development a referendum should be held to revise the constitution.

The constitutional referendum held in July 2018 proposed to permanently abolish the Constitutional Court as well as eliminate the ban on consecutive presidential terms, and amend the Fomboni Agreement reached at the end of the civil war whereby the first round of presidential elections was held on only one of the nation's three islands, rotating between them every five years; instead establishing a two-term limit and alternation between the islands only every ten years, with both cycles to begin anew in 2019.

In the months leading up to the referendum, weekly protests against "authoritarian rule" and clashes with the police occurred in the capital, Moroni. The opposition parties declared a boycott of the poll, and their leaders were detained by the army. The vice president and other members of the administration publicly condemned the proposed reforms, and were sacked by presidential decree. Nevertheless, official results claimed 92.34% support for the constitutional amendments. In the wake of the referendum on Anjouan, the island due to elect the next president according to the now-overturned Fomboni Agreement, a revolt broke out which the military put down by force, and which the administration blamed on "terrorists, as well as drug addicts and alcoholics".

Claiming that he was now eligible to serve for another ten years, Assoumani called a new presidential election in 2019, two years early. The Supreme Court barred the candidates of all major opposition parties from running. Former president and Juwa Party head Ahmed Abdallah Sambi was placed under house arrest; other opposition leaders who went into hiding were tried in absentia and given life sentences at hard labor. The parties prevented from running candidates formed a united organization, the National Council of Transition, and again declared a boycott and protest movement against the "electoral coup d'etat". Assoumani claimed victory in the election in which all other candidates were independents unaffiliated with a political party.

Both protests and the government's measures to suppress dissent escalated after the March 2019 vote. Multiple presidential candidates who rejected the official results were injured or arrested by the police, including one who was shot. Journalists were detained, newspaper issues confiscated, and printing presses raided, in response to which private media declared a boycott of government press conferences.

During an extraordinary session of the Assembly held on the evening of 3 September 2019, the administration won a vote on an enabling act giving President Assoumani the authority to rule by decree, to take any measures deemed necessary to conduct new parliamentary elections. This power was used to strip representatives of parliamentary immunity during a new round of arrests and prosecutions of opposition figures. To prevent the passage of an amnesty bill intended to prevent imprisonment for political activity, the government closed the Assembly on 31 December, before its mandate was set to expire in March 2020.

Electoral system
The 33 members of the Assembly were elected by two methods: 24 members were directly elected in single-member constituencies using the two-round system, whilst nine members (three from each) were elected by the Island assemblies of Anjouan, Grande Comore and Mohéli.

Campaign
A total of 81 candidates were approved to contest the 24 Assembly seats, including 45 independents and 35 candidates from the three parties of L'Alliance de la Mouvance Présidentielle; 21 the CRC, seven from RADHI, led by the manager of Assoumani's 2019 re-election campaign, Houmed Msaidie, and seven from the Orange Party, led by Minister of the Interior, Mohamed Daoudou, who also organized the elections and oversaw the prosecution of opposition figures. Only one candidate from an opposition party ran, representing the Democratic Rally of the Comoros, the party led by former Grand Comore Governor Mouigni Baraka.

The period leading up to election day was noted for the absence of rallies and other forms of mass mobilization typical of previous campaigns. One independent candidate was arrested, allegedly for engaging in opposition activity. The campaigns of the parties in L'Alliance de la Mouvance Présidentielle emphasized a message of mobilizing people behind national development. Representatives of RADHI and the Orange Party insisted their parties were independent and contributed to a real competition of ideas, claiming a special responsibility to hold President Assoumani and the CRC accountable and check any future abuses of power.

Results

By constituency

References

2020 in the Comoros
Elections in the Comoros
Comoros
January 2020 events in Africa
February 2020 events in Africa